Valley Lodge may refer to:

Places
Arkansas Valley Lodge No. 21, Prince Hall Masons, Wichita, Kansas, listed on the National Register of Historic Places (NRHP)
Valley Lodge (Baldwin, Maine), a historic house, NRHP-listed
Odd Fellows Valley Lodge No. 189 Building, Bay City, Michigan, NRHP-listed

Other
Valley Lodge (band)
Valley Lodge (album)